Garrow is a clachan in the Breadalbane region of Perth and Kinross, Scotland. It is located about midway between Kenmore,  to the northwest, and Amulree,   to the southeast.

Garrow Bridge, a single segmental arch bridge that crosses the River Quaich, is a Category C listed structure dating to the early 19th century.

Robert Burns passed through Garrow during his tour of the Highlands in the summer of 1787.

Gallery

References

Villages in Perth and Kinross